1,1,1-Trifluoroethane, or R-143a or simply trifluoroethane, is a hydrofluorocarbon (HFC) compound that is a colorless gas. It should not be confused with the much more commonly used HFC gas R-134a, nor confused with the isomeric compound 1,1,2-trifluoroethane.  1,1,1-Trifluoroethane has a critical temperature of 73 °C.

Applications
Trifluoroethane  is used as a refrigerant either by itself or more commonly as a component of blended mixtures. It is also used as a propellant in canned air products used to clean electronic equipment.

Environmental effects

Unlike CFCs used as refrigerants, trifluoroethane has no chlorine atoms and therefore is not ozone-depleting. Its high chemical stability and infra-red absorbency make it a potent greenhouse gas with a lifetime of about 50 years and a global warming potential of 4300, which are at the high end compared to many other commonly used HFC refrigerants.   Its abundance in the atmosphere more than doubled from about 10 parts per trillion (ppt) in 2010 to near 25 ppt in 2020.

See also
List of refrigerants
IPCC list of greenhouse gases
inhalants

References

Fluoroalkanes
Refrigerants